Kevin Tumba (born February 23, 1991) is a Belgian-DR Congolese professional basketball player for Liège Basket of the BNXT League. He usually plays at the center position.

Professional career
Tumba made his professional debut in the 2011–12 season with Belfius Mons-Hainaut. He signed a new 2-year contract in May 2014.

In June 2015, Tumba signed a 2-year contract with Belgian EuroCup team Proximus Spirou Charleroi.

On January 20, 2017, Tumba transferred to Spanish Liga ACB side UCAM Murcia, where he signed a contract until the end of the season.

On August 15, 2020, Tumba moved to Greece and signed with Kolossos Rodou. On January 15, 2021, Tumba was released from the Greek club after suffering a serious injury. He averaged 4.0 points, 4.8 rebounds, and 1.1 blocks per game.

On December 14, 2021, Tumba signed with Fos Provence Basket of the LNB Pro A.

On April 19, 2022, Tumba returned to Greece for Ionikos Nikaias. In 4 league games, he averaged 4.7 points and 5.5 rebounds, playing around 15 minutes per contest.

On June 16, 2022, he has signed with Circus Brussels of the BNXT League.

On December 29, 2022, he signed with Liège Basket of the BNXT League.

International career
Tumba represented the senior men's Belgian national basketball team at the EuroBasket 2015, where they lost to Greece in the round of 16, by a score of 54–75.

References

External links
EuroCup Profile
Champions League Profile
FIBA.com Profile (archive)
FIBA Europe Profile
Eurobasket.com Profile

1991 births
Living people
Belfius Mons-Hainaut players
Belgian expatriate basketball people in France
Belgian expatriate basketball people in Spain
Belgian men's basketball players
Belgium national basketball players
Belgian people of Democratic Republic of the Congo descent
Brussels Basketball players
CB Murcia players
Centers (basketball)
Democratic Republic of the Congo emigrants to Belgium
Democratic Republic of the Congo men's basketball players
Fos Provence Basket players
Ionikos Nikaias B.C. players
Kolossos Rodou B.C. players
Leuven Bears players
Liga ACB players
People from Lubumbashi
Spirou Charleroi players